Joseph Abraham Seckel (23 December 1881 – 3 March 1945) was a Dutch artist. His work was exhibited in the art competitions at the 1928 and 1932 Summer Olympics. His work was included in the 1939 exhibition and sale Onze Kunst van Heden (Our Art of Today) at the Rijksmuseum in Amsterdam. Seckel and his family died during the Bezuidenhout bombardment on 3 March 1945.

References

External links

1881 births
1945 deaths
Painters from Rotterdam
20th-century Dutch artists
Summer Olympics competitors for the Netherlands
Dutch civilians killed in World War II
Deaths by airstrike during World War II
Olympic competitors in art competitions